Idas is a genus of saltwater clams, marine bivalve molluscs in the family Mytilidae, the mussels.

Species 
The World Register of Marine Species lists the following species:

 Idas argenteus Jeffreys, 1876
 Idas coppingeri (E. A. Smith, 1885)
 Idas cristiani Giusti, Mietto & Sbrana, 2012
 Idas cylindricus Pelorce & Poutiers, 2009
 Idas dalli E. A. Smith, 1885
 Idas emmae Giusti, Mietto & Sbrana, 2012
 Idas filippoi Giusti, Mietto & Sbrana, 2012
 Idas ghisottii Warén & Carrozza, 1990
 Idas indicus (E. A. Smith, 1904)
 Idas jaclinae Giusti, Mietto & Sbrana, 2012
 Idas japonicus (Habe, 1976)
 Idas lamellosus Verrill, 1882
 Idas macdonaldi Gustafson, R. D. Turner, Lutz & Vrijenhoek, 1998
 Idas modiolaeformis (Sturany, 1896)
 Idas olympicus Kiel & Goedaert, 2007 †
 Idas simpsoni (J. T. Marshall, 1900)
 Idas washingtonius (Bernard, 1978)

References

 Bernard F.R. (1978). New bivalve Mollusca, subclass Pteriomorpha, from the Northeastern Pacific. Venus. 37: 61-75
 Nordsieck, F. (1969). Die europäischen Meeresmuscheln (Bivalvia). Vom Eismeer bis Kapverden, Mittelmeer und Schwarzes Meer. Stuttgart: Gustav Fischer. xiii + 256 pp.
 Giusti Fr., Mietto P. & Sbrana C., 2012. Il genere Idas (Mytilidae, Bathymodiolinae) in Mediterraneo, con la descrizione di quattro nuove specie. Bollettino Malacologico, 48(2): 122–135
 Coan, E. V.; Valentich-Scott, P. (2012). Bivalve seashells of tropical West America. Marine bivalve mollusks from Baja California to northern Peru. 2 vols, 1258 pp

External links
 effreys, J. G. (1876). New and peculiar Mollusca of the Pecten, Mytilus and Arca families, procured in the Valorous expedition. Annals and Magazine of Natural History. (4) 18: 424-436
 Iredale, T. (1915). Notes on the names of some British marine Mollusca. Proceedings of the Malacological Society of London. 11(6): 329-342.
 Gofas, S.; Le Renard, J.; Bouchet, P. (2001). Mollusca. in: Costello, M.J. et al. (eds), European Register of Marine Species: a check-list of the marine species in Europe and a bibliography of guides to their identification. Patrimoines Naturels. 50: 180-213

Mytilidae
Bivalve genera